USS Wachusett has been the name of more than one United States Navy ship, and may refer to:

 , a sloop-of-war in commission from 1862 to 1868, from 1871 to 1874, and from 1879 to 1885
 , a cargo ship in commission from 1918 to 1919

See also
 , an armed motorboat in service from 1917 to 1919

United States Navy ship names